Smokin′ is an album by saxophonist Eddie "Lockjaw" Davis with organist Shirley Scott recorded in 1958 for the Prestige label.

Reception

The Allmusic review by Scott Yanow states: "Together the group swings hard on basic originals, blues and an occasional ballad, showing why this type of accessible band was so popular during the era."

Track listing 
All compositions by Eddie "Lockjaw" Davis and Shirley Scott except as indicated   
 "High Fry" - 5:28   
 "Smoke This" - 5:01 
 "Pennies from Heaven" (Johnny Burke, Arthur Johnston) - 3:27
 "Pots and Pans" - 6:13 
 "Jaws" - 3:38
 "It's a Blue World" (George Forrest, Robert Wright) - 6:04
 "Blue Lou" (Irving Mills, Edgar Sampson) - 5:13

Personnel 
 Eddie "Lockjaw" Davis - tenor saxophone
 Shirley Scott - organ
 Jerome Richardson - baritone saxophone (track 1), flute (track 2), tenor saxophone (track 5)
 George Duvivier - bass
 Arthur Edgehill - drums

References 

Eddie "Lockjaw" Davis albums
Shirley Scott albums
1964 albums
Albums produced by Esmond Edwards
Albums recorded at Van Gelder Studio
Prestige Records albums